Eduardo Santos Itoiz (born 20 November 1973) is a Navarrese politician, Minister of Migration Policies and Justice of Navarre since August 2019.

References

1973 births
Podemos (Spanish political party) politicians
Government ministers of Navarre
Living people
Politicians from Navarre